Bempton is a village and civil parish in the East Riding of Yorkshire, England, near the border with North Yorkshire. It lies on the B1229 road between Speeton and Flamborough. It is served by Bempton railway station which is on the Yorkshire Coast Line that runs between Hull and Scarborough.

The parish of Bempton also contains Buckton village, which is situated directly next to Bempton. According to the 2011 UK census, Bempton parish had a population of 1,040, a slight decrease on the 2001 UK census figure of 1,050.

History 
Bronze Age pit dwellings have been discovered near Bempton.

From the mediaeval era until the 19th century Bempton was part of Dickering Wapentake. Between 1894 and 1974 Bempton was a part of the Bridlington Rural District, in the East Riding of Yorkshire. Between 1974 and 1996 it was part of the Borough of North Wolds (later Borough of East Yorkshire), in the county of Humberside.

Amenities
The parish church of St Michael is a Grade II* listed building and dates back to the 13th century.

The village is well known for its cliffs. Bempton Cliffs is an RSPB nature reserve, best known for its breeding seabirds, including northern gannet, Atlantic puffin, razorbill, common guillemot, black-legged kittiwake and fulmar. Bempton also used to be home to RAF Bempton, an early warning station. Some of the old buildings are still visible from the cliff top.

Bempton has a post office and general store, a garage, a hairdresser, antique shop and snooker club. It is home to Bempton Primary School, which was completely rebuilt in 2004 at a cost of over £1 million. It also has a public house, The White Horse, which has a distinctive blue tiled roof.

In 2014, after many years of fundraising and a lottery grant of £408,000, Bempton and Buckton Community Village Hall was opened on land between the two villages. There is also a children's playground close to the village hall.

Bempton, along with a number of other places in Yorkshire, was a filming location for the 2016 film Dad's Army, starring Catherine Zeta-Jones.

Gallery

See also
RAF Bempton

References

External links

Bempton Primary School website
Bempton and Buckton Community Village Hall

Villages in the East Riding of Yorkshire
Civil parishes in the East Riding of Yorkshire